Agapanthia nigriventris is a species of beetle in the family Cerambycidae. It was described by Waterhall in 1889.

References

nigriventris
Beetles described in 1889